Jatan Uikey is an Indian politician and a member of the Indian National Congress party.

Career

Political career
He became an MLA in 2013.

Political views
He supports Congress Party's ideology.

Personal life
He is married to Lalli Uikey.

See also
Madhya Pradesh Legislative Assembly
2013 Madhya Pradesh Legislative Assembly election

References

External links

Indian National Congress politicians from Madhya Pradesh
1972 births
Living people